Joseph Brooks (23 November 1885–1944) was an English footballer who played in the Football League for Barnsley and West Bromwich Albion.

References

1885 births
1944 deaths
English footballers
Association football forwards
English Football League players
Barnsley F.C. players
Rotherham County F.C. players
West Bromwich Albion F.C. players